Assinica may refer to:

 Assinica Lake, Quebec, Canada
 Assinica River, Quebec, Canada
 Assinica National Park Reserve, Quebec, Canada